Tae D. Johnson is an American law enforcement official serving as the senior official performing the duties of the director of U.S. Immigration and Customs Enforcement. The legality of his status as Acting Director of U.S. Immigration and Customs Enforcement is disputed.

Education 
Johnson earned a Bachelor of Science degree in accounting from Salisbury University.

Career 
He began his career in Salisbury, Maryland, working as an officer of the Immigration and Naturalization Service. On January 13, 2021, Johnson began serving as the senior official performing the duties of the director of U.S. Immigration and Customs Enforcement after the resignation of Jonathan Fahey.

In 2019, Johnson provided testimony to the United States House Committee on Homeland Security. 

A February 8, 2023 report from the Government Accountability Office found that Johnson's service "as Acting ICE Director from November 16, 2021, through the present day is in violation of the [Federal Vacancies Reform] Act" as it had exceeded the time limit permitted for officials to serve in an acting capacity and that "any actions taken by Mr. Johnson on or after November 16, 2021, must be nullified or viewed as having no force or effect". The U.S. Department of Homeland Security disagreed with the GAO's conclusion.

References

Notes

External links

Year of birth missing (living people)
Biden administration personnel
Living people
Salisbury University alumni
Trump administration personnel
U.S. Immigration and Customs Enforcement officials